The Macintosh Quadra is a family of personal computers designed, manufactured and sold by Apple Computer, Inc. from October 1991 to October 1995. The Quadra, named for the Motorola 68040 central processing unit, replaced the Macintosh II family as the high-end Macintosh model.

The first models were the Quadra 700 and Quadra 900, both introduced in October 1991.  The Quadra 800, 840AV and 605 were added through 1993. The Macintosh Centris line was merged with the Quadra in October 1993, adding the 610, 650 and 660AV to the range.  After the introduction of the Power Macintosh line in early 1994, Apple continued to produce and sell new Quadra models; the 950 continued to be sold until October, 1995.

The product manager for the Quadra family was Frank Casanova who was also the Product Manager for the Macintosh IIfx.

Models

The first computers bearing the Macintosh Quadra name were the Quadra 700 and Quadra 900, both introduced in 1991 with a central processing unit (CPU) speed of 25 MHz. The 700 was a compact model using the same case dimensions as the Macintosh IIci, with a Processor Direct Slot (PDS) expansion slot, while the latter was a newly designed tower case with five NuBus expansion slots and one PDS slot. The 900 was replaced in 1992 with the Quadra 950, with a CPU speed of 33 MHz. The line was joined by a number of "800-series" machines in a new minitower case design, starting with the Quadra 800, and the "600-series" pizza box desktop cases with the Quadra 610.

In 1993, the Quadra 840AV and 660AV were introduced at 40 MHz and 25 MHz respectively. They included an AT&T 3210 Digital signal processor and S-Video and composite video input/output ports, as well as CD-quality microphone and audio output ports. The AV models also introduced PlainTalk, consisting of the text-to-speech software MacinTalk Pro and speech control (although not dictation). However all of these features were poorly supported in software and a DSP was not installed in later AV Macs, which were based on the more powerful PowerPC 601 - a CPU powerful enough to handle the coprocessor's duties on its own.

Branding
Apple hired marketing firm Lexicon Branding to come up with the name. Lexicon chose the name Quadra hoping to appeal to engineers by evoking technical terms like quadrant and quadriceps.

The Quadra name was also used for the successors to the Centris models that briefly existed during 1993: The 610, the 650 and the 660AV. Centris was a "mid-range" line of systems between the Quadra on the high end and the LC on the low end, but it was later decided that there were too many product lines and the name was dropped. Some machines of this era including the Quadra 605 were also sold as Performas.

The last use of the name was for the Quadra 630, which was a variation of the LC 630 using a "full" Motorola 68040 instead of the LC's 68LC040, and introduced together with it in 1994. The 630 was the first Mac to use an IDE based drive bus for the internal hard disk drive, whereas all earlier models had used SCSI.

The first three Apple Workgroup Server models, the WGS 60, the WGS 80 and the WGS 95 (mostly called "AWS 95" for "Apple Workgroup Server") were based on the Centris 610, the Quadra 800 and the Quadra 950, respectively.

Processor
The transition to the Motorola 68040 was not as smooth as the previous transitions to the Motorola 68020 or Motorola 68030. Due to the Motorola 68040's split instruction and data caches, the Quadra had compatibility problems with self-modifying code (including relocating code, which was common under the Macintosh memory model). Apple partially fixed this by having the basic Mac OS memory copy call flush the caches. This solved the vast majority of stability problems, but negated much of the Motorola 68040's performance improvements. Apple also introduced a variant of the memory copy call that did not flush the cache. The new trap was defined in such a way that calling it on an older version of Mac OS would simply call the previous memory copy routine. The net effect of this was that many complex applications were initially slow or prone to crashing on the 68040, although developers quickly adapted to the new architecture by relying on Apple's memory copy routines rather than their own (or flushing the cache), and using the memory copy that did not flush the cache when appropriate (most of the time).

Specifications of Macintosh Quadras 
All Obsolete

Timelines

See also

 List of Macintosh models grouped by CPU type
 Timeline of Macintosh models

References

External links

 EveryMac.com - Macintosh Quadra series
 Lowendmac.com - Centris/Quadra Index

 
Computer-related introductions in 1991